Chernetcheno is a rural locality (a selo) in Uspenovsky Selsoviet of Belogorsky District, Amur Oblast, Russia. The population was 47 as of 2018. There is 1 street.

Geography 
Chernetcheno is located on the right bank of the Belaya River, 159 km northeast of Belogorsk (the district's administrative centre) by road. Zarechnoye is the nearest rural locality.

References 

Rural localities in Belogorsky District